Christopher "Christy" O'Brien (11 March 1933 – 7 March 2022) was an Irish hurler who played as a full-forward for the Laois senior team.

Born in Borris-in-Ossory, County Laois, O'Brien first arrived on the inter-county scene at the age of seventeen when he first linked up with the Laois minor team. He joined the senior panel during the 1952 championship. O'Brien later became a regular member of the starting fifteen, however, he ended his playing days without any Tier1 silverware, although he did win two NHL Div2 titles - 1960 & 1965.

As a member of the Leinster inter-provincial team on a number of occasions he won three Railway Cup medals. At club level he was a five-time championship medallist with Borris-in-Ossory.

Throughout his career O'Brien made 24 championship appearances. He retired following the conclusion of the 1970 championship.

O'Brien was regarded as one of the greatest players of all-time. He has often been voted onto teams made up of the sport's greats, including at full-forward on a special Hurling Team of the Century made up of players never to have won an All-Ireland medal.

O'Brien died on 7 March 2022, at the age of 88.

Playing career

Club

O’Brien played his club hurling with his local Borris-in-Ossory club and enjoyed much success. He was a key member of the club’s team when Borris-in-Ossory won its first senior county title in 1956. It was the first of three consecutive county titles for O’Brien and his club. He added two more county medals to his collection in 1960 and 1961.

Inter-county

O’Brien first came to prominence on the inter-county scene with the Laois minor hurling team. He had little success in this grade and made his senior debut in 1952. O’Brien’s senior inter-county career was a frustrating one as Laois were down the pecking order in terms of the hurling standard in Leinster. In spite of winning the provincial title in 1949, Laois never appeared in another Leinster final. O’Brien continued playing with the county until 1970.

Christy played his only Walsh Cup game in 1956 - then called the Leinster Council Senior Hurling Accident Fund Tournament - in Laois' first ever Walsh Cup game (against Kilkenny). O'Brien started in goals, but moved outfield for the second half.

He played a total of 66 times for Laois (24 SHC, 41 NHL & 1 Walsh Cup). At the time of his retirement, his 41 league appearances were only behind Harry Gray (44) and Paddy Lalor (43) in terms of Laois records.

Championship appearances

Inter-provincial

O’Brien also lined out with Leinster in the inter-provincial hurling competition. He won his first Railway Cup medal in 1962 as Leinster defeated Munster. O’Brien won further Railway Cup medals in 1964 and 1965.

Honours

Player

Borris-in-Ossory
Laois Senior Hurling Championship (5): 1956, 1957, 1960, 1961, 1972

Leinster
Railway Cup (3): 1962, 1964, 1965
Leinster Hall of Fame 2019

References

1933 births
2022 deaths
Borris-in-Ossory hurlers
Laois inter-county hurlers
Leinster inter-provincial hurlers